WWE Clash of Champions was a professional wrestling event produced by WWE, a Connecticut-based professional wrestling promotion. It was broadcast live and available only through pay-per-view (PPV) and the livestreaming service, the WWE Network. The event was established in 2016 and replaced Night of Champions in the late September slot of WWE's pay-per-view calendar. The event was moved to December in 2017, but returned to the September slot after the event was reinstated in 2019. An event was originally scheduled for 2021 but was canceled and replaced by that year's Extreme Rules event. Similar to Night of Champions, the theme of the event was that all active WWE championships available to each brand division featured at the event were defended.

To coincide with the brand extension, which was reintroduced in mid-2016, the inaugural Clash of Champions was held exclusively for wrestlers from the Raw brand and was the first Raw-exclusive PPV of the second brand split. The 2017 event was in turn SmackDown-exclusive. Brand-exclusive PPVs were then discontinued following WrestleMania 34 in 2018, thus the 2019 event featured Raw, SmackDown, and 205 Live, while the 2020 event just featured Raw and SmackDown after 205 Live merged under NXT in late 2019.

In total, 11 different WWE championships were defended at Clash of Champions over its four events. Only one of those 11 championships was contested at every event, which was the WWE United States Championship, although for 2019, it was on the event's pre-show.

History
Clash of Champions was established by WWE in 2016 and it replaced their previously annual pay-per-view, Night of Champions, which had run from 2007 to 2015. That event had a theme in which every active championship on WWE's main roster during those years were defended; Clash of Champions was established on a similar concept. The inaugural event was held exclusively for the Raw brand following the reintroduction of the brand extension in July 2016, where the promotion again split its roster into separate brands where the wrestlers were exclusively assigned to perform. This first event was held on September 25 that year and was the very first Raw-branded event of the second brand extension. The following year, the event was held as a SmackDown-branded event and was pushed back to December. 

In 2018, WWE discontinued brand-exclusive pay-per-views following WrestleMania 34. A Clash of Champions event was originally announced to be held that year, but it was later canceled and replaced by the all-female event, Evolution. In 2019, Clash of Champions was reinstated for the September slot. As the event was no longer brand-exclusive, the 2019 event featured the Raw, SmackDown, and 205 Live brands, but after 205 Live merged under NXT in October 2019, the 2020 event only featured Raw and SmackDown. Due to the COVID-19 pandemic, the 2020 event was held behind closed doors in WWE's bio-secure bubble, the WWE ThunderDome, hosted at the Amway Center in Orlando, Florida.

An event for 2021 was originally scheduled to be held on September 26 at the Nationwide Arena in Columbus, Ohio. However, on July 9, 2021, WWE announced that Extreme Rules would instead take place on that date at that venue due to WWE rescheduling Money in the Bank to take place on Extreme Rules' original July date. Clash of Champions itself was quietly canceled without a new date being scheduled, and no further events have been scheduled since.

Concept
The concept of Clash of Champions was that all active WWE championships available to each brand division featured at the event were defended. For example, the inaugural event was a Raw-exclusive pay-per-view, as such, only the titles exclusive to Raw at the time were defended. After brand-exclusive pay-per-views were discontinued in 2018 and after the establishment of two non-brand exclusive championships in 2019, every title available to each brand featured on the event were defended. For example, in 2019, the event featured Raw, SmackDown, and 205 Live, so all the championships available to those three brands at the time were defended. 

Although the event was centered around championship matches, non-championship matches occurred at the 2016, 2017, and 2019 events. In 2020, every match on the card was a championship match. With a total of 11 championships at the 2019 event, two titles were defended on the Kickoff pre-show to reduce the actual pay-per-view's runtime. The 2020 event had one championship match occur on the pre-show. In total, 11 different WWE championships were defended at the pay-per-view over its four events.

Notes

Events

References

External links

 
Recurring events established in 2016